Stephen Rendell (May 24, 1819 – April 4, 1893) was an English-born merchant and politician in Newfoundland. He represented Trinity Bay in the Newfoundland House of Assembly from 1859 to 1873.

He was born in Coffinswell, Devon, the son of John Rendell. In 1834, he was apprenticed to the merchants Bulley, Job and Company operating in St. John's.  In 1859, he became a partner. Rendell, a supporter of union with Canada, was named to the colony's Legislative Council in 1874. He served as a founding member and president of the St. John's Agricultural Society. As a hunter, Rendell helped implement the introduction of snowshoe hares, now an important small game animal and food source on the island, from Nova Scotia. He resigned from business and returned to England in 1881 because of ill health due to asthma, later dying in Coffinswell at the age of 73.

Personal life
Rendell married Catharine Norris in 1852.  He had at least three children, including sons R.G. Rendell, A.S. Rendell and Doctor Rendell.

References 

Members of the Newfoundland and Labrador House of Assembly
Members of the Legislative Council of Newfoundland
1819 births
1893 deaths
English emigrants to pre-Confederation Newfoundland
Newfoundland Colony people